The Westport Library is a public library in the town of Westport, Connecticut, established on February 4, 1886, by members of the Westport Reading-Room and Library Association.

Morris Ketchum Jesup, born in 1830 to a country doctor, amassed a fortune in the railroad business and became the benefactor of the library, donating the land and $5,000 for the building. In April 1908, the Westport Public Library was completed at a cost of $75,000 and dedicated to the custody of the Westport Library Association by Jesup's wife, following the wishes of her husband who died four months earlier.

In June 1984, plans were announced to build a new library on a site adjacent to Jesup Green on the Saugatuck River. Considerable discussion took place about how to raise the money for the new library and the proposed site, a former landfill. After a referendum was approved, the new library was built for $4.6 million and opened on Labor Day of 1986.
 
As popularity of the library increased, another renovation and expansion was completed in 1998. The improvements included an innovative project called the "River of Names," a wall of small handmade tiles, paid for individually by donors, depicting local history.

By the year 2000, the library was the second busiest in the state in terms of circulation per capita, averaging 1,200 visitors a day.

Embracing a trend in expanding the role of libraries, the library opened a makerspace in 2012, a structure with 3D printers and other tools for people to create inventions and learn about new technology. The name of the library was changed to The Westport Library.

In 2013, the library received a $246,545 grant from the Institute of Museum and Library Services for the enhancement of the makerspace. In 2014, the library became the first library in the nation to use humanoid robots for the purpose of teaching computer programming.

In September 2017, ground was broken on a renovation project for the library, dubbed the "Transformation Project." The renovation lasted two years, and the library was reopened on June 23, 2019.

As a "forum for civic engagement and an incubator of new ideas," the Library provides many books and resources geared to fundraising, social entrepreneurship, and non-profit organizations. An example of a book about social entrepreneurship is the memoir, "Start Something that Matters" by Blake Mycoskie, the founder of the global footwear giant, Toms Shoes. The Library has the distinction of being a Funding Information Network partner of the Foundation Center, the nation's leading authority on organized philanthropy.  A Grants Center section provides additional guides and manuals for becoming effective fundraisers for causes of all types and sizes.

References

Library buildings completed in 1908
Library buildings completed in 1986
Public libraries in Connecticut
Buildings and structures in Westport, Connecticut
Libraries in Fairfield County, Connecticut
1908 establishments in Connecticut